Football at the 2015 Pacific Games in Port Moresby, Papua New Guinea was held on July 3–17, 2015.

The Games were brought to international attention when Vanuatu defeated Micronesia 46–0 in the men's tournament.

Medal summary

Medal table

Results

References

External links
Official 2015 Pacific Games website
XV Pacific Games Men's Tournament, Official OFC website
XV Pacific Games Women's Tournament, Official OFC website

 
2015 Pacific Games
Pacific Games
2015
2015 Pacific Games